Dodson Peninsula is an ice-covered peninsula,  long, located south of Hansen Inlet on the Orville Coast, situated in Palmer Land, Antarctica. It was discovered by the Ronne Antarctic Research Expedition (RARE), 1947–48, under Finn Ronne, and named by him after Captain Harry L. Dodson, U.S. Navy, a director of the American Antarctic Society (the organizing body of RARE), and for his son, Robert H.T. Dodson, assistant geologist, surveyor, and chief dog team driver with RARE.

References 

Peninsulas of Palmer Land